Yong Hoon Lee (born 12 July 1955) is the President of Ulsan National Institute of Science and Technology , South Korea. He is an electrical engineer specializing in wireless communications and signal processing.

Early life
Lee received his bachelor's and master's degree in electrical and computer engineering from Seoul National University, Korea in 1978 and 1980 respectively. In 1984, Lee received his Ph.D. degree in electrical and computer engineering from the University of Pennsylvania, USA.

Career
From 1984 to 1988, Lee joined the SUNY, Buffalo, NY, as an assistant professor in electrical and computer engineering. 
In 1989, he joined KAIST as a faculty member. From 2004 to 2005, he became Head of the Electrical Engineering Department. From 2005 to 2011, he became Dean of the College of Engineering. From 2011 to 2013, he became Provost of KAIST. In 2019, Lee became the 4th President of UNIST.

Awards
Lee has received numerous awards, including the distinguished service medal from Institute of Electronics, Korea and the Presidential Citation from the President of South Korea.

References

External links

Seoul National University alumni
University of Pennsylvania alumni
Academic staff of KAIST
1955 births
Living people
Academic staff of Ulsan National Institute of Science and Technology